Ulladulla is a coastal town in New South Wales, Australia in the City of Shoalhaven local government area. Ulladulla has close links with the nearby historic settlement of Milton and many services are shared between these towns.

History
The name Ulladulla is the modern spelling of an Aboriginal word, the meaning of which is unknown. Some records show the name meaning "safe harbour" but local Aboriginal Elders dispute the meaning and point out that a harbour for boats is a modern idea. The name was corrupted to "Holy Dollar" at one time. Alternative spellings as Woolladoorh or Ngulla-dulla have been recorded. The first euoropean Settler was Rev Thomas Kendall in 1828 who started Australian Red Cedar cutting at Yackungarrah and Narrawallee Creek in Yatte Yattah, 4 kilometres north of present day Milton.

Geography
The Ulladulla area is a seven-kilometre stretch of continuous urban residential development from the southern edge of Ulladulla, through the town of Mollymook, to Narrawallee in the north, terminating at the Narrawallee estuary. At the 2016 census the population of the suburb of Ulladulla was 6,615.

Ulladulla is surrounded by the adjoining towns of Milton and Burrill Lake as well as Mollymook and Narrawallee. The extended area from Burrill Lake to Milton is referred to as the Milton–Ulladulla area. The population of the Ulladulla area, including Milton, Narawallee and south to Dolphin Point was 16,495 as at June 2019, having grown an average of 1.66 percent year-on-year over the preceding five years.

Close landmarks include Pigeon House Mountain and "The Castle", both named due to the unique shapes of the mountain. Pigeon House was sighted by Captain James Cook upon his journey along the eastern shores of Australia. Pigeon House has recently been renamed "Didhol" in deference to the elders of the Yuin tribe, who previously inhabited the area Ulladulla was built upon. The traditional name of the peak, Didhol, means "woman's breast", from the mountain's clear resemblance to the shape of a woman's breast.

Climate
Along with the rest of the NSW South Coast, Ulladulla has a mild oceanic climate (Cfb) and experiences lukewarm summers and mild winters. The climate is influenced by the warm waters of the adjacent Tasman Sea and is characteristically mild without extreme high or low temperatures. Climatic data has been recorded at Ulladulla by the Bureau of Meteorology since 1989.

Ulladulla Harbour

Ulladulla Harbour is a minor port administered by Land and Property Management Authority.

The first white Settler was Rev Thomas Kendall in 1828 who started cedar cutting at Narrawallee Creek in Yatte Yattah.

A wooden jetty was built in 1859 so as to retain the services of the Illawarra Steam Navigation Company; the company had informed the farmers that would not call again at Ulladulla unless better mooring facilities were provided. After seven years the jetty was replaced by a stone pier built by the government on the natural reef.  The company built a store on the harbour foreshores for the receiving of produce for shipment to and from Sydney. There was a weekly cargo service to Ulladulla until the mid-1950s. In 1873, a lighthouse was constructed on the harbour breakwater, and it was known at the time as the Ulladulla Lighthouse. It was relocated in 1889 to Warden Head, south of the harbour, where it is still active.

During the mid-1890s, a 4 ft (1220 mm) gauge tramway was laid out to the end of the main stone wharf. Manpower and horses were used to move the low wagons. During the period 1910–11, a double line of track was laid to the end of the pier. Public Works Department records disclose maintenance of track and repair of wagons at least to 1947–48. Almost all trace of the line had gone by 1991.

The harbour is the home port of the largest commercial fishing fleet on the South Coast of New South Wales.

Blessing of the Fleet festival
The Blessing of the Fleet festival has been held regularly at Easter since 1956. This is a centuries-old tradition which originated in Sicily, Italy, and has been continued by the area's descendants of the original Italian immigrant fishing community.

A significant element of the festival is the religious Blessing of the Fleet ceremony held at Ulladulla Harbour on Easter Sunday. The festivities conclude with fireworks display, over the harbour on Easter Sunday and the Harbour Markets on Easter Monday.

Although the accompanying celebration was canceled due to a sharp rise in the public liability premium in 2004 and 2005, the ceremony returned in 2008.

Public transport
Premier Motor Service operate two daily service in each direction between Sydney and Eden as well as two services from Bomaderry railway station that connect with NSW TrainLink services.

Ulladulla Buslines provides local bus services on weekdays with a reduced service on Saturdays. Three routes operate from Ulladulla. Routes 740 and 740V run from Burrill Lake to Milton via Kings Point, Ulladulla, Mollymook and Narrawallee. Route 741 runs at a lesser frequency on weekdays only from Ulladulla to Kiola via Burrill Lake, Tabourie, Termeil and Bawley Point. Taxis and private hire cars are also available for transport throughout the district.

Commercial area 
Ulladulla's commercial area is located along Princes Highway and in surrounding streets featuring numerous clusters of shops. Ulladulla Shopping Centre features a Woolworths supermarket and 8 speciality stores. Dolphin Court contains a Coles supermarket and 7 speciality stores, next to it is The Reject Shop. Ulladulla also has an Aldi supermarket, Bunnings Warehouse, Mitre 10, Best & Less, Harris Scarfe and a K Hub store (formerly Target Country, closed February 2021). Ulladulla's arcades are located on Princes Highway including Rowen's Arcade which contain a cinema, Funland arcade and 23 speciality stores. Eastside Mall, Plaza, Riviera Arcade, Phillip Centre and Bellbrook Arcade are also located along Princes Highway.

Education
Ulladulla Public School was established in August 1861. Ulladulla High School was established in January 1974.

Notable people
Winter Warden (1860–1936), a former member of the NSW Legislative Council, was born in Ulladulla.
A. B. Shand KC (1865 – 1949), barrister and King's Counsel and Royal Commissioner was born in Ulladulla.

Media
Ulladulla has since 1878 been served by weekly newspaper the Milton Ulladulla Times.

Parliamentary representation
Ulladulla is in the federal division of Gilmore, represented by Labor MP Fiona Phillips. Ulladulla is in the state seat of South Coast.

References

External links

Rainfall Data Month Jul - Dec 2007
Ulladulla Blessing of the Fleet Festival official website
VISITNSW.com - Ulladulla
 

City of Shoalhaven
Towns in the South Coast (New South Wales)
Coastal towns in New South Wales